USS Cutlass (SS-478), is a Tench-class submarine now in the service of the Republic of China Navy. She was the only ship of the United States Navy to be named for the cutlassfish, a long, thin fish found widely along the coasts of the United States and in the West Indies. Her keel was laid down by the Portsmouth Navy Yard on 10 July 1944. She was launched on 5 November 1944 sponsored by Mrs. R. E. Kintner, and commissioned on 17 March 1945 with Commander Herbert L. Jukes in command.

[[File:USS Cutlass in Greece.jpg|thumb|left|'Cruising the Mediterranean Sea, visiting France, Greece, Turkey, North Africa, Gibraltar, Malta, and Spain.]]

Operational history

1945–1973 (US Navy)
Departing Portsmouth, New Hampshire, on 25 April 1945, Cutlass arrived at Pearl Harbor on 15 July and put out on her maiden war patrol two days later. Assigned to patrol in the vicinity of the Kurile Islands, she entered the area one day after the announced Japanese surrender, remained on observation patrol until 24 August, then returned to Pearl Harbor.  She sailed on 2 September for New York, arriving 24 September to receive visitors through Navy Day.Cutlass cruised on the East Coast until 8 January 1946 when she cleared for the Panama Canal Zone. Except for three months of operations in Delaware Bay, Cutlass remained in the Caribbean Sea, based at Cristóbal, Canal Zone. From 23 August to 2 October 1947 she made a cruise down the coast of South America, around Cape Horn, visited Valparaíso, Chile, and returned to the east coast of South America through the Straits of Magellan.Cutlass left the Panama Canal Zone 6 January 1948 for local operations at Key West, Florida, then entered Philadelphia Naval Shipyard in March for overhaul and modernization. Arriving at Key West 7 February 1949 she served as test submarine for Operation "Rainbow" evaluating color schemes to enhance livability, a serious problem in new submarines with long submergence capability. She continued to sail out of Key West until the summer of 1952 when her home port was changed to Norfolk, Virginia.

In 1953 Cutlass cruised to the Mediterranean Sea, visiting France, Greece, Turkey, North Africa, Gibraltar, Malta, and Spain, then sailed in Cuban waters to act as target for destroyers and aircraft engaged in antisubmarine exercises. She joined in local operations, fleet exercises and antisubmarine warfare training in the Caribbean Sea until September 1956 when she departed for the Mediterranean and operations with NATO forces including the Sixth Fleet. She visited Italy, Greece, Crete, Majorca, Portugal and England, returning to Norfolk in December. In 1958 she sailed on a north European cruise, visiting Rosyth, Scotland, Copenhagen and Korsor, Denmark, and passing through the Kiel Canal.
In the first half of 1959, Cutlass joined in the antisubmarine warfare development work of Task Force "Alfa" off the Virginia Capes, and in September sailed for the Mediterranean. In November she passed through the Suez Canal to join ships of the Pakistani Navy in exercises off Karachi, returning to Norfolk in December. After continued operations with TF "Alfa," she entered Philadelphia Naval Shipyard in February 1960 for an overhaul which continued until August. Cutlass was decommissioned and struck from the Naval Vessel Register on 15 April 1973.

In the first half of 1959, Cutlass joined in the antisubmarine warfare development work of Task Force "Alfa" off the Virginia Capes, and in September sailed for the Mediterranean. In November she passed through the Suez Canal to join ships of the Pakistani Navy in exercises off Karachi, returning to Norfolk in December. After continued operations with TF "Alfa," she entered Philadelphia Naval Shipyard in February 1960 for an overhaul which continued until August. Cutlass was decommissioned and struck from the Naval Vessel Register on 15 April 1973.

 1973–present (Taiwan) 

On 4 December 1973, Cutlass had her torpedo tubes sealed and was sold to Taiwan, where she was commissioned in the Republic of China Navy as ROCS Hai Shih'' (SS-791), (meaning "sea lion"). They then tried to restore its torpedo capabilities. In January 2017, Taiwan announced that it would receive a retrofit to extend its service life until 2026, making it the longest-serving submarine in history. The submarine is still operational and reportedly capable of combat. The $19 million retrofit was to improve the hull and the diesel vessel's navigational elements.

References

External links

 navsource.org: USS Cutlass
 Taipei Times, 17 April 2007: World's longest-serving sub feted
USS Cutlass naval webring page
USS Cutlass - new HOME PORT page
USS "Cutlass" Shipmate Connection" 

Tench-class submarines
Ships built in Kittery, Maine
1944 ships
World War II submarines of the United States
Cold War submarines of the United States
Tench-class submarines of the Republic of China Navy
Hai Shih-class submarines
Submarines of the Republic of China